That's My Boy is a 1954–1955 CBS situation comedy television series based on the 1951 Dean Martin and Jerry Lewis film of the same name. The series, written by Bob Schiller and Bob Weiskopf filmed before a live audience, starred Eddie Mayehoff as Jack Jackson, Sr., Gil Stratton as Jack, Jr., and Rochelle Hudson as Alice Jackson, the wife and mother. The senior Jackson is a construction contractor who had been a star football player in college, and he is determined to have "Junior" follow in his gridiron path at their common alma mater.

Broadcast
The series aired at 9 p.m. Eastern in the slot following My Favorite Husband and preceding June Havoc's sitcom Willy on CBS. Both That's My Boy and Willy aired opposite The George Gobel Show on NBC. The following season, 1955–1956, this time slot was occupied by the first year of the western Gunsmoke. CBS aired reruns of Thats My Boy at 7:30 p.m. on Sunday from June to September 1959.

References

External links

1954 American television series debuts
1955 American television series endings
1950s American sitcoms
Black-and-white American television shows
English-language television shows
CBS original programming